Zabbai is a name of uncertain meaning.

It appears in the Bible in Ezra , and in Nehemiah , where Zabbai is given as the father of Baruch, who "earnestly repaired" part of the walls of Jerusalem.

References

Hebrew Bible people